The 38th New Zealand Parliament was a term of the New Zealand Parliament. It was elected at the 1975 general election on 29 November of that year.

1975 general election

The 1975 general election was held on Saturday, 29 November.

Sessions
The 38th Parliament sat for four sessions (there were two sessions in 1977), and was prorogued on 7 October 1978.

Ministries

Overview of seats
The table below shows the number of MPs in each party following the 1975 election and at dissolution:

Notes
The Working Government majority is calculated as all Government MPs less all other parties.

Initial composition of the 38th Parliament

By-elections during 38th Parliament
There were a number of changes during the term of the 38th Parliament.

Notes

References

38